The Orange and Alexandria Railroad Hooff's Run Bridge is a bridge in Alexandria, in the U.S. state of Virginia.

Built by the Orange and Alexandria Railroad, the bridge was listed on the U.S. National Register of Historic Places in 2003.

See also
List of bridges on the National Register of Historic Places in Virginia

References

Bridges completed in 1856
Railroad bridges in Virginia
Buildings and structures in Alexandria, Virginia
Railroad bridges on the National Register of Historic Places in Virginia
National Register of Historic Places in Alexandria, Virginia
Stone arch bridges in the United States